"Do It Again Medley with Billie Jean" is a song by the Italian music project Club House, released in 1983. The song combines elements of two hits made famous by other artists: "Do It Again", a 1973 top-ten hit by Steely Dan and Michael Jackson's number-one song from earlier in the year, "Billie Jean".

Songwriting credit on the track is given to Jackson as well as the primary members of Steely Dan, Walter Becker and Donald Fagen.

The song reached the Billboard Hot 100 at number 75, but was a much bigger hit in Belgium, Ireland, the Netherlands and the UK, where it peaked at 6, 7, 10 and 11 on their local charts, respectively.

Charts

Weekly charts

Year-end charts

Slingshot version

"Do It Again Medley with Billie Jean" was covered the same year by Detroit-based band Slingshot. It was their only song to reach the Billboard charts in the US, where it spent one week at number one on the Hot Dance Club Play chart in August 1983.

See also
List of number-one dance singles of 1983 (U.S.)

References

External links
Lyrics of this song

1983 debut singles
Club House (band) songs
Music medleys
1983 songs
Quality Records singles
Songs written by Michael Jackson
Songs written by Donald Fagen
Songs written by Walter Becker